Arenigobius leftwichi, commonly known as the oyster goby, is a fish native to Australia and New Caledonia. It is camouflaged in these surroundings, easy to overlook. It has been recorded in singles and in small groups. They can grow to  standard length.

References

leftwichi
Fish described in 1910